1945–46 Hong Kong Challenge Shield (known as Sincere Perfumery Co. Shield for sponsorship reasons) was the first edition of Hong Kong Challenge Shield after World War II.

Fixture and results

Second round (Quarter-finals)
The draw result was printed on 7 March 1946 on The China Mail.

Semi-finals

Final

Replay

References

Challengge Shield
Hong Kong Senior Challenge Shield
Hong Kong Challenge Shield